"Party Line" is a disco song written and produced by Gregg Diamond and performed by the Andrea True Connection. It was released as the second single from her album More, More, More in 1976. The song was a minor commercial success, only reaching lower regions of the US and Canadian charts. It received a positive review in the Cash Box magazine.

In 1976, Andrea sang the song on Don Kirshner's Rock Concert, along with "More, More, More" and "Fill Me Up (Heart to Heart)".

Track listing
7" single
A. "Party Line" – 3:22
B. "Call Me" – 3:12

Charts

References

External links
 Official audio on YouTube
 Andrea True Connection at Discogs

1976 singles
1976 songs
Andrea True Connection songs
Buddah Records singles
Songs about telephone calls
Songs written by Gregg Diamond